Selena Millares (born Las Palmas de Gran Canaria, 1963) is a Spanish writer and professor.

She was born in Las Palmas de Gran Canaria and got her Ph.D. in Literature at the Universidad Complutense de Madrid. She has lived in Minneapolis, Paris, Berlin, Santiago de Chile and Alghero. Since 1996, she is a professor at the Universidad Autónoma de Madrid. She is the author of numerous essays as well as creative works (poetry, prose, painting), which suggest an interdisciplinary dialogue and the return to the original humanism, based on the integral conception of art and thought.

Awards 

2013, International Poetry Award of the city of Sassari, Italy.
2014, International Literature Award Antonio Machado, Collioure, France.

Works 
Páginas de arena (poetry), 2003
Isla del silencio (poetry), 2004
Cuadernos de Sassari (poetry), 2013 
Sueños del goliardo (poetry and painting), 2013
Isla y sueño (catalogue and poetry), 2014
El faro y la noche (novel), 2015

Essays
La maldición de Scheherazade, 1997
Rondas a las letras de Hispanoamérica, 1999
Neruda: el fuego y la fragua, 2008
La revolución secreta, 2010
De Vallejo a Gelman, 2011
Prosas hispánicas de vanguardia, 2013

References

External links 
  
 The Center for Visual Arts in Gran Canaria exhibits Selena Millares’s solo show ‘Isla y sueño' (in Spanish)
 Selena Millares’s Website (Universidad Autónoma de Madrid)
Selena Millares at Crimic Paris Sorbonne
Selena Millares at Dialnet

1963 births
21st-century Spanish poets
Living people
Spanish women poets
21st-century Spanish women writers